Simone Ponte Ferraz (born 12 March 1990) is a Brazilian athlete specialising in the 3000 metres steeplechase. She has won two medals at the South American Championships. She competed at the 2020 Summer Olympics.

Her personal best in the event is 9:45.11 seconds set in La Nucia in 2021.

International competitions2

Personal bests
Outdoor
800 metres – 2:16.42 minutes (Itajaí 2013)
1500 metres – 4:27.19 minutes (Jaraguá 2018)
3000 metres steeplechase – 9:45.11 minutes (La Nucia 2022)
5000 metres – 16:02.34 minutes (Rio de Janeiro 2022)
10,000 metres – 35:20.95 minutes (Jaraguá 2019)
10 kilometres – 34:51 minutes (Santos 2021)
Half marathon – 1:15:21 hours (Rio de Janeiro 2021)
Marathon – 2:38:10 hours (Buenos Aires 2019)

References

External links

1990 births
Living people
Brazilian female steeplechase runners
Sportspeople from Santa Catarina (state)
Athletes (track and field) at the 2019 Pan American Games
Pan American Games competitors for Brazil
Athletes (track and field) at the 2020 Summer Olympics
Olympic athletes of Brazil
21st-century Brazilian women